August de la Motte (17 November 1713 – 29 August 1788) was a Hanoverian general who notably served in the Great Siege of Gibraltar.

De la Motte was born on 17 November 1713 in the Principality of Brunswick-Wolfenbüttel. He served in the Hanoverian Army during the Seven Years' War, notably participating in the Second Siege of Cassel. In 1775 the Duke and Prince-elector of Hanover was George III, who also ruled the Kingdom of Great Britain in personal union. King George had to deal with the American Revolution and the outbreaking American Revolutionary War and prepared to ready Hanoverian troops for garrison duty so that British troops would be freed for service in America.

On 16 October de la Motte, by now a colonel, was given command of a Hanoverian brigade of three battalions, totalling 15 companies of infantry and three companies of Grenadiers; and sent to Gibraltar for garrison duty. In the next year he was promoted to major general. During the Great Siege of Gibraltar, de la Motte served as third-in-command of the British garrison. They held out for three years and seven months before the siege was finally lifted. De la Motte, who had been promoted to lieutenant general in 1781 while still being besieged, was highly praised by his commanding officer afterwards. To commemorate their bravery Motte's troops were awarded the battle honour "Gibraltar", a cuffband which its successor formations in the Imperial German Army would eventually wear while fighting against British troops wearing the same cuffband during World War I.

Returning home from Gibraltar to Hanover in 1784 the exhausted de la Motte retired, dying four years later on 29 August 1788.

External links
 Painting of Major General August de la Motte, after 1787. Harvard Art Museum
 Hanoverians at the Siege - Gibraltar 1779-83

German generals
People from Wolfenbüttel (district)
Huguenot participants in the American Revolution
18th-century German military personnel
Hanoverian military personnel of the American Revolutionary War
Military history of Gibraltar
1713 births
1788 deaths